The 1954–55 Polska Liga Hokejowa season was the 20th season of the Polska Liga Hokejowa, the top level of ice hockey in Poland. Nine teams participated in the league, and KS Cracovia won the championship.

First round

Group I

Group II

Second round

Final round

5th-8th place

External links
 Season on hockeyarchives.info

Polska
Polska Hokej Liga seasons
1954–55 in Polish ice hockey